Western long-eared bat may refer to the following bat species:

 Myotis evotis, also known as long-eared myotis, found in North America
 Nyctophilus major, found in southwest Australia